Štefanovičová is a village and municipality in the Nitra District in western central Slovakia, in the Nitra Region.

History
In historical records the village was first mentioned in 1268.

Geography
The village lies at an altitude of 145 metres and covers an area of 12.399 km². It has a population of about 260 people.

Ethnicity
The population is about 98% Slovak.

Facilities

The village has a public library a gym and football pitch.

References

External links
http://www.statistics.sk/mosmis/eng/run.html

Villages and municipalities in Nitra District